Marian Donnelly (née Devlin; August 1938 in Castledawson, County Londonderry) is a former president of the Workers' Party and is a member of the District Policing Partnership for the Magherafelt district of Northern Ireland.

Life and career
She first became involved in political activity in 1955 when she campaigned for the republican candidate Tom Mitchell in the Mid Ulster constituency and in the re-run of that election after Mitchell was barred from being a candidate because he was in jail for republican activities at the time.

Donnelly was a founding member and the first Secretary of the South Derry Civil Rights Association, a branch of the Northern Ireland Civil Rights Association.   Her husband, Francie Donnelly, was its first Chairman and is also a prominent member of the Workers' Party.

Ms. Donnelly trained as a primary teacher and later also taught at second level.

She became active in Sinn Féin in the 1960s and when the organisation split in 1970 she remained with Official Sinn Féin which subsequently became the Workers' Party.  She has contested several elections on behalf of the party.

In March 1992, Donnelly was elected as President of the Workers' Party following the breakaway of a parliamentary grouping from the party, making her the second female leader of an Irish political party and at the time the first woman to lead a party which was represented in Dáil Éireann.  She retired from the position in 1994 but has remained an active member of the Workers' Party.

She has been a member of the Glen GAC Club in her native Derry and is actively involved in the Brackaghreilly and District Community Association.

She and her husband have three adult children.

References

1938 births
People from County Londonderry
Living people
Workers' Party (Ireland) politicians
Women in the politics of Northern Ireland
20th-century politicians from Northern Ireland